Linsengericht is a municipality in the Main-Kinzig district, in Hesse, Germany.

Geography

Location
The municipality lies in the Main-Kinzig district of Hesse. It is located in the valley of the Kinzig, south and southeast of the town of Gelnhausen. Its territory also extends into the wooded hills of the Spessart.

Subdivision

Linsengericht consists of the Ortsteile Altenhaßlau, Eidengesäß, Geislitz (with Hof Eich and Eichermühle), Großenhausen (with Waldrode) and Lützelhausen.

Name
Linsengericht is derived from "court under the linden" from "Linde" (German for "linden" - another term for the lime tree) and "Gericht" (German for "court").

References

External links

 Website of Linsengericht

Municipalities in Hesse
Main-Kinzig-Kreis